Trichilia pallens is a species of plant in the family Meliaceae. It is found in Brazil and Paraguay. It is threatened by habitat loss.

References

pallens
Flora of Brazil
Flora of Paraguay
Near threatened flora of South America
Taxonomy articles created by Polbot